Explore! is a children's museum planned for Washington, D.C. by Jane Cafritz, a D.C. area real estate developer and philanthropist.  It will be located within a development being erected by Cafritz in the Fort Totten neighborhood.

A pre-opening exhibit, also called Explore!, will be held at the National Portrait Gallery.  It will include portrait-related exhibits where children can make portraits with media, making self-portraits or portraying their caregivers with portraits involving selfies, or using art supplies.  Sponsored by  Jane Cafritz and Calvin Cafritz,  Morton and Grace Bender,  and Paul and Rose Carter, it is slated to run at the Portrait Gallery for a year.

See also
 KID Museum

References

Proposed museums in the United States
Children's museums in Washington, D.C.

External links